Stephen Daniel van Vuuren (born 26 September 1959) is a South African professional golfer who currently plays on the Sunshine Tour. He won 7 times on the Sunshine Tour between 1994 and 2007.

Van Vuuren was born Germiston, Gauteng, South Africa. He currently lives in Mpumalanga. He turned professional in 1981 and joined the Sunshine Tour in 1993. before that he played on the SA Winter Tour, winning the Order of Merit in 1995. His best year by far on the Sunshine Tour was in the 1995-96 season where he won 4 times, finishing 7th on the Order of Merit.

Amateur highlights
2nd Transvaal Strokeplay
Northern Transvaal & Eastern Transvaal Junior
Eastern Transvaal & Eagles Representative
Transvaal Under 23
South African Pro Team Vs Springboks

Professional wins (13)

Sunshine Tour wins (7)
1994 FNB Pro Series: Botswana Open
1995 Iscor Newcastle Classic, Mmabatho Sun Classic, Sanlam Classic Tournament, FNB Pro Series: Botswana Open
2004 Vodacom Origins of Golf Tour – Schoeman Park
2007 Mount Edgecombe Trophy

Other South Africa wins (6)
1988 Club Pro Championship
1989 SA Winter Champion, Stannic Sun City Pro-Am, State Mines
1992 Centurion Lake Challenge
1996 J & B Africa Classic

External links

South African male golfers
Sunshine Tour golfers
Sportspeople from Germiston
People from Mpumalanga
1959 births
Living people